Bernhard Max Friedrich August Gustav Louis Kraft Prinz und Markgraf von Baden, Herzog von Zähringen (born 27 May 1970), sometimes styled Margrave of Baden, previously also known as Bernhard, Hereditary Prince of Baden, is the head of the House of Baden since 29 December 2022 following the death of his father, Maximilian. He is a first cousin once removed of King Charles III of the United Kingdom.

Early life

Prince Bernhard was born in Schloss Salem, Salem, Baden-Württemberg, Germany, the eldest son of Maximilian, Margrave of Baden, and Archduchess Valerie of Austria-Tuscany.

Activities
A commercial lawyer by training, he studied business administration and law in Hamburg and Switzerland. Prince Bernhard manages the family estates including Staufenberg Castle and the margravine wineries dedicated to preserving the grape variety Müller-Thurgau.  In the years 2000-2009 he oversaw the transfer of many family assets, including Eberstein Castle and parts of Schloss Salem to the German state in order to stabilise the family's finances.

Through his paternal grandmother, Princess Theodora, Bernhard was a grandnephew of Prince Philip, Duke of Edinburgh. The Duke often went to Germany to shoot with the family. In 2021, Bernhard was one of only 30 mourners at his granduncle's funeral at St George's Chapel, Windsor Castle. He also attended the state funeral of Queen Elizabeth II at Westminster Abbey, London, on 19 September, 2022, with his mother and his wife.

Following the death of his father, Maximilian on 29 December 2022, he became head of the former grand ducal house of Baden, traditionally styled HRH The Margrave of Baden, Duke of Zähringen.

Marriage and children
He married Stephanie Anne Kaul (born 27 June 1966 at Uelzen), daughter of Christian Kaul and wife Hannelore Scheel, in a civil ceremony on 22 June 2001 and a religious ceremony the following day. The marriage was acknowledged as dynastic by his father. 

The couple has three sons:

Leopold Bernhard Max Michael Ernst-August Friedrich Guillaume (born 18 May 2002 at Ravensburg)
Friedrich Bernhard Leopold Christian Berthold Christoph (born 9 March 2004 at Ravensburg)
Karl-Wilhelm Bernhard Max Alexander Ernst-August Heinrich-Donatus Mathais (born 11 February 2006 at Ravensburg)

The family lives in Linzgau near Schloss Salem.

Ancestry

Notes and References

External links

1970 births
Living people
People from Bodenseekreis
House of Zähringen
Princes of Baden
Margraves of Baden